Live Phish Vol. 17 was recorded live at Portland Meadows in Portland, Oregon, on July 15, 1998. It was the first of a series of four concerts picked by Mike Gordon to release. Except for Live Phish Volume 20, the releases include his journal entries about the shows in the booklet.

This was the first concert on the band's US leg of their 1998 summer tour. The bonus track is a very popular version of "Bathtub Gin" recorded live at the Riverport Amphitheater in Maryland Heights, Missouri, a suburb of St. Louis.

Track listing

Disc one
Set one:
"Wolfman's Brother" (Anastasio, Fishman, Gordon, Marshall, McConnell) – 9:26
"Water in the Sky" (Anastasio, Marshall) – 3:15
"The Moma Dance" (Anastasio, Fishman, Gordon, Marshall, McConnell) – 10:33
"Guyute" (Anastasio, Marshall) – 12:46
"Horn" (Anastasio, Marshall) – 4:00
"Portland Jam" (Anastasio, Fishman, Gordon, McConnell) – 6:19
"Chalk Dust Torture" (Anastasio, Marshall) – 8:51
"Brian and Robert" (Anastasio, Marshall) – 3:35
"Beauty of My Dreams" (McCoury) – 3:20
"Cars Trucks Buses" (McConnell) – 5:30

Disc two
Set one, continued:
"Roggae" (Anastasio, Fishman, Gordon, Marshall, McConnell) – 9:26
"Birds of a Feather" (Anastasio, Fishman, Gordon, Marshall, McConnell) – 9:03
"Loving Cup" (Jagger, Richards) – 7:50
Set two:
"Limb by Limb" (Anastasio, Herman, Marshall) – 14:05
"Simple" (Gordon) – 9:37
"Tweezer" (Anastasio, Fishman, Gordon, McConnell) – 6:19
"California Love" (Cocker, Cunningham, Durham, Hooks, Hudson, Stainton, Troutman) – 1:51
"Tweezer" (Anastasio, Fishman, Gordon, McConnell) – 7:16
"Free" (Anastasio, Marshall) – 11:26

Disc three
Set two, continued:
"Meat" (Anastasio, Fishman, Gordon, Marshall, McConnell) – 5:04
"Harry Hood" (Anastasio, Fishman, Gordon, Long, McConnell) – 14:22
Encore:
"Wilson" (Anastasio, Marshall, Woolf) – 7:03
"Tweezer Reprise" (Anastasio, Fishman, Gordon, McConnell) – 4:02
Filler (July 29, 1998, Riverport Amphitheatre, Maryland Heights, Missouri):
"Bathtub Gin" (Anastasio, Goodman) – 23:57

Personnel
Trey Anastasio – guitars, lead vocals, co-lead vocals on "Roggae" and "Meat"
Page McConnell – piano, organ, backing vocals, co-lead vocals on "Roggae", "Loving Cup" and "Meat"
Mike Gordon – bass, backing vocals, co-lead vocals on "Roggae" and "Meat"
Jon Fishman – drums, backing vocals, lead vocals on "The Moma Dance", co-lead vocals on "Roggae" and "Meat"

References

17
2003 live albums
Elektra Records live albums